Papadoplaka is a natural reef islet off the southern coast of the Greek island of Crete in the Libyan Sea. The islet is in a bay between cape Lithino and cape Kefalas, at Kommos, and close to Gortyn which was the ancient capital of Crete. The name can be loosely translated as the priest's rock. It is administered within Heraklion regional unit.

Group of islets 

There are a group of four islets in the bay including Papadoplaka (to the west), Megalonisi (with the lighthouse), Mikronisi (also known as Agios Pavlos), and Trafos.

Minoan era 
Papadoplaka was more substantial in Minoan times, due to lower sea levels, and is likely to have offered safe harbour for ships in that part of the bay. J. W. Shaw believes that Papadoplaka is likely to have been linked with the coast via a partially submerged sandy shore. This would make a Minoan harbor at Kommos similar to the harbor at Amnisos.

References 

Landforms of Heraklion (regional unit)
Mediterranean islands
Uninhabited islands of Crete
Islands of Greece